Všetaty is a market town in Mělník District in the Central Bohemian Region of the Czech Republic. It has about 2,300 inhabitants.

Administrative parts
The village of Přívory is an administrative part of Všetaty.

Geography
It lies in the Central Elbe Table. The Košátecký Stream flows through the market town.

History
The first written mention of Všetaty is from 1255. Přívory was first mentioned in 1321. The railway was built in 1864, but the station was not opened until 1873.

Transport
Všetaty is an important railway hub. Two main railways Prague–Turnov and Kolín–Rumburk crosses here.

Sights
The landmark of Všetaty is the Church of Saints Peter and Paul. It was built in the Baroque style in 1780 and rebuilt in the Neoromanesque style in 1885.

Notable people
Jan Palach (1948–1969), student who self-immolated himself in a protest against the Warsaw Pact invasion of Czechoslovakia

References

External links

Market towns in the Czech Republic
Populated places in Mělník District